The Definitive Collection is an album released by MCA records and is a compilation of country singer Patsy Cline's work.

This is one of Patsy Cline's better-known compilations. The album consists of all Cline's big late-1950s and early-1960s hits. Unlike the massive-selling 12 Greatest Hits album, the version of "Walkin' After Midnight" on this album is the original version, not the remake. It also features her signature tune, "Crazy", as well as her other big hit "I Fall to Pieces", along with her 1963 hits, and even singles released after her death, like "He Called Me Baby" and "Always".

Track listing

Critical reception
The Definitive Collection received a perfect five stars from William Ruhlmann of Allmusic. In his review, Ruhlmann describes the collection as "an excellent single-disc sampler of Patsy Cline."

Chart performance
The Definitive Collection peaked at number 52 on the U.S. Billboard Top Country Albums chart. It has sold 180,300 copies in the United States as of October 2019.

References

Patsy Cline albums
2004 compilation albums